The 2019–20 Louisiana–Monroe Warhawks men's basketball team represented the University of Louisiana at Monroe in the 2019–20 NCAA Division I men's basketball season. The Warhawks, led by 10th-year head coach Keith Richard, played their home games at Fant–Ewing Coliseum in Monroe, Louisiana as members of the Sun Belt Conference. They finished the season 9–20, 5–15 in Sun Belt play to finish in a tie for 11th place. They failed to qualify for the Sun Belt tournament.

Previous season
The Warhawks finished the 2018–19 season 19–16, 9–9 in Sun Belt play to finish in a tie for 6th place. In the Sun Belt tournament, they defeated Appalachian State in the first round, Coastal Carolina in the second round, before falling to Georgia Southern in the quarterfinals. They were invited to the CIT, where they defeated Kent State in the first round, before falling to Texas Southern in the quarterfinals.

Roster

Schedule and results

|-
!colspan=12 style=| Regular season

|-

Source

References

Louisiana–Monroe Warhawks men's basketball seasons
Louisiana-Monroe Warhawks
Louisiana-Monroe Warhawks men's basketball
Louisiana-Monroe Warhawks men's basketball